Franz Novotny (born 30 May 1949) is an Austrian film producer, director and screenwriter who was born in Vienna. His 2003 film Yu was entered into the 25th Moscow International Film Festival.

Novotny and his wife Karin founded the production company Novotny & Novotny.

Selected filmography
 Exit... nur keine Panik (director, screenplay, 1980)
  (director, screenplay, 1985)
 Schmutz (screenplay, 1987)
 Yu (director, screenplay, 2003)
 Jew Suss: Rise and Fall (screenplay, producer, 2010)
 Therapy for a Vampire (producer, 2014)
 Egon Schiele: Death and the Maiden (producer, 2016) won 2017 Romy
 The Ground Beneath My Feet (producer, 2019)
 7500 (co-producer, 2019)

References

External links

1949 births
Living people
Austrian film producers
Austrian film directors
Austrian screenwriters
Austrian male screenwriters
Film people from Vienna